Daniel West Lee (July 9, 1919 – November 28, 2014) was an American special effects artist. He was known for his work on Arthur Penn's Bonnie and Clyde, most notably orchestrating the film's famous, bullet-ridden finale in which the title duo are killed in a hail of gunfire. He was also known for contributing effects work to over fifty live-action features for The Walt Disney Company between 1959 and 1980, including Mary Poppins, The Love Bug, and Academy Award-winning work on Bedknobs and Broomsticks.

References

External links
 

1919 births
2014 deaths
People from Prescott, Arizona
People from Wisconsin
Best Visual Effects Academy Award winners
Special effects people